George T. Boult was a noted English cricketer of the late 18th century who was a member of the Hambledon Club.

Boult was an amateur player who was involved in organising matches as well as being a good batsman.  He is primarily associated with Berkshire via the influential Maidenhead club.  Boult was probably Berkshire's best regular player during the short period that it enjoyed first-class status, although the team did benefit from appearances by such as Thomas Taylor, William Fennex, William Beldham, David Harris and other good players of the time.  Boult subsequently played for Middlesex.

Boult was elected to membership of the Hambledon Club in 1786, when it was already past its heyday.  He resigned in 1791 but he did play a few games for Hampshire.

He made 20 known first-class appearances from 1785 to 1797.  He had several good scores including two fifties (53 & 55) in one match for Berkshire v Essex in 1785.  Later, when playing for Middlesex, he made two good scores against MCC: 89 in 1791 and 76 in 1795.  He made a century (108) in a minor match for Windsor Forest versus a Surrey XI in 1788.  Prevailing conditions were heavily in favour of the bowlers and 50 runs was a very high score indeed.

There were several cricketing Boults, including his own son George Boult junior.  Members of the Boult family were playing club cricket in Maidenhead as late as 1836.

References

English cricketers
Berkshire cricketers
Middlesex cricketers
English cricketers of 1701 to 1786
English cricketers of 1787 to 1825
People from Maidenhead
Hampshire cricketers
Marylebone Cricket Club cricketers
Hambledon cricketers
White Conduit Club cricketers
Gentlemen of England cricketers
Year of birth missing
Year of death missing